Samuel Fischli (born 2 April 1998) is a New Zealand rugby union player who players for  in the National Provincial Championship (NPC). His playing position is flanker.

Early life
Fischli attended Tokomairiro High School in Milton, New Zealand.

Rugby career
Fischli initially played for Milton's Toko RFC before moving to Dunedin. He played his Dunedin club career for Taieri RFC. Including the debut, Fischli made two appearances for Otago during the 2020 Mitre 10 Cup season.

In 2021 Fischli continued playing for Otago.

Reference list

External links
itsrugby.co.uk profile

New Zealand rugby union players
Living people
Rugby union flankers
Otago rugby union players
1998 births
People educated at Tokomairiro High School
People from Milton, New Zealand
Highlanders (rugby union) players
Rugby union players from Otago
New England Free Jacks players